The Bāb al-Islām Mosque is situated in southern Peru, at the southern entrance to the city of Tacna. Although there are other mosques in Peru, this is the only one that is an example of Islamic architecture in Peru. Combined with the adjoining Shah Wali-Ullah School of Sciences, it is the largest mosque in the region. Prayers are offered bilingually in both Spanish and Arabic.

History
The mosque was built by a group of Pakistani merchants who had arrived to Peru in the 1990s and were importing used cars from Japan and the United States with the permission of President Alberto Fujimori. The Pakistani community in Tacna grew to 95 people by 1995, increasing to 500 by the end of the 20th century. The complex was founded in 2000, and its construction was completed by 2008. Mohammad Usman served as imam in 2015.

Gallery

See also
  List of mosques in the Americas
  Lists of mosques

References

Mosques in Peru
Buildings and structures in Tacna Region
Mosques completed in 2008
2000 establishments in Peru